Mikael Phillips is a Jamaican politician from the People's National Party.

Following the death of Elizabeth II, Phillips stated his desire that the end of the Queen's reign would hasten Jamaica's transition to a republic.

References 

Living people
21st-century Jamaican politicians
People from Manchester Parish
Members of the House of Representatives of Jamaica
People's National Party (Jamaica) politicians
Year of birth missing (living people)
Jamaican republicans
Members of the 13th Parliament of Jamaica
Members of the 14th Parliament of Jamaica